The Chinese Taipei Amateur Radio League (CTARL) is a national non-profit organization based in Taiwan for amateur radio enthusiasts in the Republic of China.  Key membership benefits of the organization include QSL bureau services and a monthly membership magazine called HamFormosa,  CTARL represents the interests of amateur radio operators before telecommunications authorities in the Republic of China as well as international authorities.  CTARL is the member society representing the Republic of China in the International Amateur Radio Union.

See also 
Associação dos Radioamadores de Macau
Chinese Radio Sports Association
Hong Kong Amateur Radio Transmitting Society

References 

China
Cultural organizations based in Taiwan
Radio in Taiwan
Organizations based in Taipei